Donald R. Paul is an American materials scientist and engineer currently the Ernest Cockrell, Sr. Chair in Engineering at University of Texas at Austin. His interests are polymer engineering, biomaterials and membranes. An expert in his field, he was Elected to the National Academy of Engineering in 1988 and also has been Elected to the American Institute of Chemical Engineers and American Chemical Society.

Education
He earned his B.S. in chemical engineering from North Carolina State University in 1961 and his Ph.D in chemical engineering from University of Wisconsin in 1965.

Selected publications
 Y. T. Sung, P. D. Fasulo, W. R. Rodgers, Y. T. Yoo, Y. Yoo and D. R. Paul, “Properties of Polycarbonate/Acrylonitrile-butadiene-styrene/Talc Composites,” J. Appl. Polym. Sci., 124, 1020 (2012).
 C. H. Lau, D. R. Paul and T. S. Chung, “Molecular Design of Nanohybrid Gas Separation Membranes for Optimal CO2 Separation,” Polymer, 53, 454 (2012).
 M. W. Spencer, M. D. Wetzel, C. Troeltzsch and D. R. Paul, “Effects of Acid Neutralization on the Properties of K+ and Na+ Poly(ethylene-co-methacrylic acid) Ionomers,” Polymer, 53, 569 (2012).
 M. W. Spencer, M. D. Wetzel, C. Troeltzsch and D. R. Paul, “Effects of Acid Neutralization on the Morphology and Properties of Organoclay Nanocomposites formed from K+ and Na+ Poly(ethylene-co-methacrylic acid) Ionomers,” Polymer, 53, 555 (2012).
 R. R. Tiwari and D. R. Paul, “Polypropylene-Elastomer (TPO) Nanocomposites: 3. Ductile-brittle Transition Temperature,” Polymer, 53, 823 (2012).

References

External links

American materials scientists
University of Texas faculty
American chemical engineers
North Carolina State University alumni
 University of Wisconsin–Madison College of Engineering alumni
Living people
Year of birth missing (living people)